Goran Galešić (born 11 March 1989) is a Bosnian professional footballer who plays as a midfielder for First League of FBiH club Goražde.

Club career
Galešić started his career at Borac Banja Luka. In 2007, he joined Slovenian club Gorica, where he stayed until the summer of 2010, when his contract with the club expired. In June 2010 it was reported by the media that Galešić has signed a three-year contract with Serbian team Partizan. However, in September 2010 Galešić returned to Gorica after negotiations failed with Partizan. Galešić signed a two-year contract with possible extension for another year.

In 2012, he signed a one-year contract with Beerschot and played in several matches, before being released in December of the same year.

In June 2013 he signed a contract with Hajduk Split but three weeks later, in July 2013, his contract was mutually terminated after continuous racial abuse from a small, radical minority of Hajduk's fans.

Botev Plovdiv
Galešić signed a two-year contract with Botev Plovdiv on 22 August 2014. He made an unofficial debut for his new team during the friendly game with Rakovski. Galešić scored two goals as Botev Plovdiv won the game 6–5.

Galešić made a debut for Botev Plovdiv in A Grupa on 12 September 2014. He was brought on as a substitute during the second half in the match against Ludogorets Razgrad. He played well and was involved in the goal scored by his team but it was not enough because his team had conceived two goals before his appearance on the field and Botev Plovdiv lost the game 2–1. At the end of 2014 Goran Galešić became a free agent after a mutual termination of his contract with Botev Plovdiv.

Sheriff Tiraspol
On 29 May 2016, Galešić scored the goal to win the Divizia Națională with Sheriff Tiraspol.

Celje
He signed for Celje in the Slovenian PrvaLiga on 21 January 2017.

International career
Galešić was capped for Bosnia and Herzegovina at under-18, under-19, and under-U21 levels.

Honours
Koper
Slovenian Cup: 2014–15
Slovenian Supercup: 2015

Sheriff Tiraspol 
Divizia Națională: 2015–16

Notes

References

External links
Goran Galešić at PrvaLiga 

1989 births
Living people
Sportspeople from Banja Luka
Serbs of Bosnia and Herzegovina
Association football midfielders
Bosnia and Herzegovina footballers
Bosnia and Herzegovina youth international footballers
Bosnia and Herzegovina under-21 international footballers
FK Borac Banja Luka players
ND Gorica players
Beerschot A.C. players
FC Koper players
HNK Hajduk Split players
Botev Plovdiv players
FC Sheriff Tiraspol players
FC Khimki players
NK Celje players
FK Krupa players
Floriana F.C. players
FK Zvijezda 09 players
FK Goražde players
Premier League of Bosnia and Herzegovina players
Slovenian PrvaLiga players
Belgian Pro League players
First Professional Football League (Bulgaria) players
Moldovan Super Liga players
Maltese Premier League players
Slovenian Second League players
First League of the Republika Srpska players
First League of the Federation of Bosnia and Herzegovina players
Bosnia and Herzegovina expatriate footballers
Expatriate footballers in Slovenia
Expatriate footballers in Belgium
Expatriate footballers in Croatia
Expatriate footballers in Bulgaria
Expatriate footballers in Moldova
Expatriate footballers in Russia
Expatriate footballers in Malta
Bosnia and Herzegovina expatriate sportspeople in Slovenia
Bosnia and Herzegovina expatriate sportspeople in Belgium
Bosnia and Herzegovina expatriate sportspeople in Croatia
Bosnia and Herzegovina expatriate sportspeople in Bulgaria
Bosnia and Herzegovina expatriate sportspeople in Moldova
Bosnia and Herzegovina expatriate sportspeople in Russia
Bosnia and Herzegovina expatriate sportspeople in Malta